The Indiscretions of Eve is a 1932 British comedy film directed by Cecil Lewis and starring Steffi Duna, Fred Conyngham and Lester Matthews. It was made by British International Pictures at the company's Elstree Studios near London. The film's sets were designed by the art director Clarence Elder.

Cast
 Steffi Duna as Eve  
 Fred Conyngham as Sir Peter Martin  
 Lester Matthews as Ralph  
 Tony Sympson as Pip  
 Jessica Tandy as Maid  
 Clifford Heatherley as Butler  
 Hal Gordon as Simms  
 Muriel Aked as Mother 
 Arthur Chesney as Father  
 George Mozart as Smart  
 Teddy Brown as Barman 
 Marius B. Winter as Band Leader 
 George Gray as Minor Role  
 Pearl Hay as Minor Role  
 Stella Nelson as Minor Role  
 Bruce Winston as Minor Role

References

Bibliography
 Low, Rachael. Filmmaking in 1930s Britain. George Allen & Unwin, 1985.
 Wood, Linda. British Films, 1927-1939. British Film Institute, 1986.

External links

1932 films
British comedy films
1932 comedy films
Films shot at British International Pictures Studios
Films directed by Cecil Lewis
British black-and-white films
1930s English-language films
1930s British films